Lady Danger is a 2020 Burmese comedy-drama film starring Khant Si Thu, Khar Ra, Htun Eaindra Bo, Eaindra Kyaw Zin, Paing Phyo Thu and Mone. The film, produced by Shwe Si Taw Film Production premiered in Myanmar on February 27, 2020.

Cast
Khant Si Thu as U Nay Lin Shein
Khar Ra as Hnin Maung
Htun Eaindra Bo as Daw Khin Ma Ma
Eaindra Kyaw Zin as Yu Ya Zaw
Paing Phyo Thu as Akyin Nar Moe
Mone as Phyu Lay Nwe

References

External links

2020 comedy-drama films
2020 films
Burmese drama films
2020s Burmese-language films
Films shot in Myanmar